Karyl Ross "Ken" Harris (July 31, 1898 – March 24, 1982) was an American animator best known for his work at Warner Bros. Cartoons under the supervision of director Chuck Jones.

Life and career 
Ken Harris was born in Tulare County, California. He finished his education at  an unknown college in Stockton, New Jersey. Harris started as a race car builder and driver with his brother, who had a garage. Harris and his brother had to spend $4,000 dollars ($ in today's terms) on a race track. He raced at Ascot three times in 1926. One time he went 113 miles. Around the time he was a racer, he started being an assistant service vice manager and selling cars at a Pontiac agency before the agency eventually closed down.  His first job as an artist was for Sid Ziff, where he sold some cartoons to him here and there. Then he worked for the  Los Angeles Herald Examiner, from 1927 to around 1930, when he joined the ill-fated Romer Grey studio. Harris finally ended up at Leon Schlesinger Productions under the Friz Freleng unit. This lasted for a short while until he was relocated into the Frank Tashlin unit. Eventually, Tashlin left and the unit was taken over by Chuck Jones. The association with Jones and Harris began in 1937 and lasted until 1962, the longest time an animator spent with a director at the studio. Harris briefly animated for the UPA short The Brotherhood of Man. Harris would sometimes go play tennis and buy a new car, according to Jerry Beck and assistant for Jones named Corny Cole. Jones described him as "a virtuoso. Ken Harris did it all." Dan Backslide, one of the characters from the Jones short The Dover Boys, was a caricature of Harris.

After Jones left Warner's, Harris worked with former animator Phil Monroe on two cartoons before Warner Bros. closed its cartoon department. In 1963, Harris worked briefly for Friz Freleng on the titles of The Pink Panther (1963), then for Hanna-Barbera on their first feature film Hey There It's Yogi Bear! (1964), then rejoined Jones at MGM for three years. After work as an animator on How the Grinch Stole Christmas! (1966) — directed by Jones, a longtime friend of Dr. Seuss — Harris came to the studio of independent animator Richard Williams in London in 1967. There he served as William's mentor as well as his employee. Harris's credits with him included A Christmas Carol (1971) — as animator of Ebenezer Scrooge — the opening titles of The Return of the Pink Panther (1975), and the still-unfinished animated feature The Thief and the Cobbler (animating the Thief of the title, which is very reminiscent of Harris's earlier work animating Wile E. Coyote for Jones).

Among the many scenes Harris animated: Mama Bear doing an outrageous tap dance (which Chuck Jones, who directed the cartoon, and who was Harris' longtime collaborator, has said was inspired by Michael Maltese, "who could really dance that way") in A Bear For Punishment; Wile E. Coyote consuming earthquake pills in Hopalong Casualty; and the lengthy dance sequence in What's Opera, Doc?.

Harris died on March 24, 1982, from Parkinson's disease in Woodland, California, at 83 years of age.

Awards 
At the 1981 Annie Awards, ASIFA-Hollywood awarded Harris the Winsor McCay Award for lifetime achievement in the field of animation.

References

External links 
 
 Official site of Ken Harris Retrieved December 2011

1898 births
1982 deaths
Animators from California
American animated film directors
American cartoonists
Neurological disease deaths in California
Deaths from Parkinson's disease
People from Tulare County, California
Artists from Los Angeles
Warner Bros. Cartoons people